Ekaterina Aleksandrovna Sochneva is a Russian international football midfielder playing for Zenit Saint Petersburg in the Russian Championship.

She previously played for Gömrükçü Baku in Azerbaijan and Spartak Moscow, ShVSM Izmailovo, Zorkiy Krasnogorsk and FK Rossiyanka in Russia before moving to CSKA in 2017.

Results

1 The scoreline was subsequently changed for a 3–0 default win.

References

1985 births
Living people
Russian women's footballers
Russia women's international footballers
CSP Izmailovo players
FC Zorky Krasnogorsk (women) players
WFC Rossiyanka players
Women's association football midfielders
ZFK CSKA Moscow players
ZFK Zenit Saint Petersburg players
Footballers from Moscow
UEFA Women's Euro 2017 players
Russian Women's Football Championship players